An autobiography is a book or other work about the life of a person, written by that person.

Autobiography may also refer to:
 Autobiography (Morrissey book)
 Autobiography (Nat Adderley album)
 Autobiography (Abdullah Ibrahim album)
 Autobiography (Ashlee Simpson album), or the title track
 Autobiography (film), 2022 internationally co-produced film
 Auto-Biography (Le Car album)
 John Cowper Powys's Autobiography
 Autobiography, the autobiography of British philosopher John Stuart Mill
 "Autobiography", a song by British rapper from his 2021 album Conflict of Interest

See also
 An Autobiography (Nehru)
 The Autobiography (Vic Mensa album)